Many members of the British Royal Family have seen service in British or other Commonwealth armed forces, others hold honorary ranks or positions. This is a list detailing formal military service by members of the British royal family.

There is also a list of military titles, service appointments and various job titles within the Royal Family, listed below. These roles are honorary and may, or may not, also be held by Royals who are ex-military or serving military persons.

I.e. Princess Anne, whilst not having any military service, holds many ranks and roles within HM Armed Forces.

List
The honorary ranks and titles are included in a separate column. The "rank whilst active" column dictates the rank worn and held whilst the Royal was serving with the armed forces and the "current rank worn" column denotes any rank worn currently (notably honorary rank, promotions). Members of the royal family receive regular promotions even after their active service has ended.

Key
A number of abbreviations, acronyms and initialisms are used, to save space:
 
RN - Royal Navy
RNR - Royal Navy Reserve
RNVR - Royal Naval Volunteer Reserve
RM - Royal Marines
RAF - Royal Air Force
MC - Military Cross

Living Members of the Royal Family

Deceased Members of the Royal Family

Notes
Medals that are shown in the "Medals" column, generally only include awards that include a medal ribbon that is worn in uniform, as opposed to some decorations which may be represented by other means. Click or tap on the ribbon to see the name and details.
Ranks that are shown in the "Rank whilst active" column are generally the highest rank achieved by the royal. Rank achieved later (i.e. after retirement from active service and movement to reserve list) is displayed in the "Current rank worn" column.
Rank is received and awarded by members of the Royal Family in generally two ways:
 They receive a regular commission after undergoing officer training with one of the Armed Services at their respective establishments; (Britannia Royal Naval College, Royal Military Academy Sandhurst and Royal Air Force College Cranwell).
 They are appointed to an honorary rank, either in addition to their regular rank or instead of, if they are not actively serving officers.

N.B. Upon leaving active service, royal members are generally promoted to the rank they would have received, if they had stayed in the Armed Services.

Ranks and roles held by Royals with no military service (honorary ranks)

These Royals hold various ranks and royals, within HM Armed Forces, which are generally known as "Honorary Ranks". Listed below are only the British ones, but there are many more held throughout the Commonwealth. 

These may include:

Royal Colonel - an appointment made by the Monarch, to appointment of Colonel-in-Chief or Colonel of a regiment 

Honorary Air Commodore-in-Chief and Honorary Air Commodores for the Royal Air Force

Honorary Commodore-in-Chief for the Royal Navy.

Military service of English monarchs

A few English monarchs came to the throne from other countries and served in the armies of their home country. A few served in other armies during their exile.

See also
British royal family
The Canadian Crown and the Canadian Armed Forces
List of honours of the British royal family by country
British Armed Forces
United Kingdom

References

British monarchy
Royal fam
British royal family